Silver Lake Provincial Park is a provincial recreation park in the municipality of Tay Valley, Lanark County in Eastern Ontario, Canada.

Park activities include:
Canoeing/boating
Fishing - Northern pike, Smallmouth bass, Lake trout, Yellow perch, and sunfish.
Hiking - A boardwalk crosses a marsh at the eastern end of Silver Lake. The marsh is a transition between wetland and upland forest which is rich in flora and fauna.
Wildlife viewing - A wide variety of animals, including skunks, woodchucks, raccoons, rabbits and chipmunks live here. Harmless snakes, painted turtles, toads, bullfrogs and leopard frogs inhabit the wetland. Overhead, see and hear the eastern kingbird and red-winged blackbird.

References
https://web.archive.org/web/20100508193130/http://www.ontarioparks.com/english/silvl-multiple.html

External links

Provincial parks of Ontario
Protected areas of Lanark County
Year of establishment missing